Sergey Zhukov may refer to:

 Sergey Aleksandrovich Zhukov (b. 1956), retired Russian cosmonaut
 Sergey Nikolaevich Zhukov (b. 1967), Soviet and Russian footballer with FC Torpedo Moscow, 1. FSV Mainz 05, FC Lokomotiv Moscow and FC Tom Tomsk
 Sergey Petrovich Zhukov (b. 1975), Russian ice hockey player
 Sergey Yevgenyevich Zhukov (b. 1976), musician with the group Ruki Vverh!
 Sergeant Sergey Zhukov, a recurring character in the television series JAG.